Durkan-e Pain (also Romanized as Dūrkān-e Pā’īn; also known as Dūrkān-e Pāeen) is a village in Geshmiran Rural District, in the Central District of Manujan County, Kerman Province, Iran. At the 2006 census, its population was 21, in 5 families.

References 

Populated places in Manujan County